Nesocaryum is a monotypic genus of flowering plants belonging to the family Boraginaceae. The only species is Nesocaryum stylosum.

Its native range is the Desventurados Islands, off the coast of Chile.

References

Boraginoideae
Boraginaceae genera
Monotypic asterid genera